Luka Karabatic (born 19 April 1988) is a French handball player for Paris Saint-Germain and the French national team.

He is the younger brother of Nikola Karabatić.

Biography
Karabatic was born in France to Croatian dad and Serbian mom. He came from a handball family – his father, Branko who is originally from Trogir, Croatia, is a former Yugoslavian handballer who played as goalkeeper in the national team. His older brother, Nikola, is one of the best handball players in the world who was named best player in the world by IHF two times, but Karabatic decided to play tennis and won France championship for 10 years old in 1998. In 2007, when he was 19, Karabatic started to train handball with the youth team of Montpellier Handball as center back. In 2009 he joined the senior team of the club, in the same year his older brother returned to Montpellier AHB again.

In his first two years as professional player, Karabatic won the French championship two times in 2009 and 2010. After his two successful seasons in Montpellier, the club decided to extend his contract until 2016. He became the second pivot in rotation after Issam Tej. In June 2006, Karabatic debuted for France in a friendly tournament in Argentina.

On 30 September 2012, he was involved in a match-fixing and arrested with his brother Nikola and his wife. On 2 October, he was indicted and then released for €4,500. Few days after his release from custody, Karabatic released from Montpellier AHB because of "serious disciplinary offenses". He signed for Pays d'Aix Université, which only promoted to LNH Division 1, with his brother Nikola. In their first season in the club, the Karabatic brothers took the team to the 9th place in the league.

In 2014, Karabatic played for the first time with France in an official competition in EHF Euro in Denmark. In 2015 he won the World Championship with France.

References

External links

1988 births
Living people
French male handball players
French people of Serbian descent
French people of Croatian descent
Sportspeople from Strasbourg
Olympic handball players of France
Handball players at the 2016 Summer Olympics
Medalists at the 2016 Summer Olympics
Olympic silver medalists for France
Olympic medalists in handball
Montpellier Handball players
Handball players at the 2020 Summer Olympics
Medalists at the 2020 Summer Olympics
Olympic gold medalists for France